The Bishops' High School is a high school in Georgetown, Guyana.

History
It was established in 1870 by the Anglican Church as a girls' school. It later merged with Mrs. Vyfhuis' school, also founded in 1870, and then with the DeSaffon school. Vyfhuis was offered headship of the combined schools in 1875. The school's first home was at Brickdam and Manget Place, and then at "Minto House" on Waterloo Street. It later moved to "Lamaha House" at Carmichael and Lamaha Streets, the property of Bishop E. A. Parry.

In 1907, Bishop E. A. Parry moved the school to "Woodside House" (now known as "Transport House") on Main Street, and it became known as "Woodside House School". In 1921 the school moved to its present location at Carmichael and Murray (now known as Quamina) streets. In 1922 Bishop E.A. Parry retired and the school then became known as "The Bishops' High School". Parry died in 1936 and the "Oswald Parry Hall" was opened at the school. 

In January 1936, the school was handed over to the government of British Guiana. The new building was opened on January 5, 1946. The school celebrated its centennial in 1970 and became a co-educational institution in 1975.

The school's mottos are "Labor Omnia Vincit" and "What so ever thy hand findeth to do,do it with thy might, for there is no worth nor device nor knowledge nor wisdom in the grave wither though goest".

Houses and their colours 
Each house is named after a former headmistress. 
 Allen House: golden yellow
 Baskett House: pink
 Dewar House:  blue
 Vyfhuis House:  purple
 Wearn House: red

References

External links
Bishops' High School Alumni Association Toronto Chapter
Bishops' High School Old Students' Association
Bishops' High School Alumni Association New York Tri-State Chapter
The above links are to three of the international chapters of the BHS alumni associations. There are other chapters in London, England; Kingston, Jamaica; Trinidad and Tobago; Barbados; California; Florida and Washington DC in the USA.

Educational institutions established in 1870
High schools and secondary schools in Guyana
1870 establishments in the British Empire